Anatoliy Kostiantynovych Holubchenko (born 6 June 1950 in Zhdanov, Soviet Union), is a Ukrainian politician. From 14 December 2013 to 25 January 2014, he was a temporary acting head of the Kyiv City State Administration.

On 14 December 2013 President Viktor Yanukovych suspended Holubchenko's predecessor Oleksandr Popov. The same day the General Prosecutor of Ukraine's Office handed "a notification on suspicion of abuse of power when ordering the Euromaidan police actions of 30 November 2013" out to Popov and Holubchenko was appointed as acting Head of Kyiv City Administration. On 24 December 2013 Holubchenko stated that he regularly met with (his predecessor) Popov.

Holubchenko led a crackdown against the sex trade in Kyiv during the Euro 2012 football tournament, ordering the police and SBU to investigate brochures advertising massage parlors across the city.

References

External links
 Holubchenko at Liga Dossier
 The life of the Kyiv elite: estate of Anatoliy Holubchenko. Ukrayinska Pravda. 26 November 2007

1950 births
Living people
Politicians from Mariupol
Second convocation members of the Verkhovna Rada
Party of Regions politicians
Governors of Kyiv
Industry ministers of Ukraine
First vice prime ministers of Ukraine
Laureates of the State Prize of Ukraine in Science and Technology